Super Express may refer to:

Super Express (newspaper), a Polish tabloid newspaper
Super Express USA, a Polish-American newspaper
Super Express (film), a 2016 Chinese film directed by Song Xiao

Express trains
Patna - Hatia Super Express, an Indian express train between Patna and Hatia, Ranchi
Super Express (Pakistan), a defunct Pakistani express train between Karachi and Malakwal
Hitachi Super Express, a proposed British train
British Rail Class 800
British Rail Class 801
Shinkansen